Giorgi Tsmindashvili (born 17 May 1976) is a Georgian judoka.

Achievements

References

1976 births
Living people
Male judoka from Georgia (country)
Judoka at the 1996 Summer Olympics
Olympic judoka of Georgia (country)
Place of birth missing (living people)
20th-century people from Georgia (country)